Huang Shanshan (born January 18, 1986, in Fujian) is a female Chinese trampoline gymnast who won bronze in the individual competition at the 2004 Summer Olympics. In the 2012 Summer Olympics, she finished in second place.

Career
At the 2003 Trampoline World Championships, Huang was the first Chinese trampolinist to make a world final, qualifying in third place and finishing eighth.

During the 2006 Trampoline World Cup, she won titles in two individual competitions held in Switzerland and Germany. At the 2008 Olympic Games, she failed to advance to the finals due to a fall in the qualification round.

In the 2012 Summer Olympics, she placed second in the preliminary and final competition winning a silver medal.

Major achievements
 1998 National Champion's Tournament: First team, second individual
 1999 National Championship: First team/individual
 1999 National Champion's Tournament: First team, third individual
 1999 National Trampoline Championship, Tianjin: First women's team, fourth individual
 1999 Trampoline World Age Group Championship, South Africa: Second, age group
 2000 National Championship/National Champion's Tournament: First team, second individual
 2001 National Championship: First team/individual
 2001 National Champion's Tournament/National Games Finals: First team, eighth individual
 2001 Trampoline World Youth Championship, Sydney: Second, individual
 2001 Preliminaries of the 9th National Games (National Championship): First, individual
 2001 Trampoline World Age Group Championship, Denmark: First, individual (in women's age group of 15-16)
 2001 The Ninth National Games Finals: First, women's team
 2002 National Championship: First synchronized (with Zheng Xiaojun)
 2002 National Champion's Tournament: First team/individual
 2003 Trampoline World Championships: Eighth, individual
 2003 World Cup, France: Second individual
 2003 World Championship, Germany: Second team, eighth individual
 2004 Athens Olympics: Third, individual women's single jump, the first trampoline medal by a Chinese athlete in a trampoline event
 2005 National Championship: First, team
 2005 10th National Games: First, team/individual
 2006 Trampoline World Cup: First, individual
 2012 London Olympics: Silver

References

External links
 
 
 
 

1986 births
Living people
Chinese female trampolinists
Gymnasts at the 2004 Summer Olympics
Gymnasts at the 2008 Summer Olympics
Gymnasts at the 2012 Summer Olympics
Olympic silver medalists for China
Olympic bronze medalists for China
Olympic gymnasts of China
Sportspeople from Fuzhou
Olympic medalists in gymnastics
Medalists at the 2012 Summer Olympics
Medalists at the 2004 Summer Olympics
Asian Games medalists in gymnastics
Gymnasts at the 2006 Asian Games
Gymnasts at the 2010 Asian Games
Asian Games gold medalists for China
Medalists at the 2006 Asian Games
Medalists at the 2010 Asian Games
Medalists at the Trampoline Gymnastics World Championships
Gymnasts from Fujian
21st-century Chinese women